Camilyne Oyuayo (born 16 April 1982) is a Kenyan rugby sevens player. She was selected for the Kenyan women's national rugby sevens team for the 2016 Summer Olympics.

References

External links 
 
 Player profile at shujaapride.com

1982 births
Living people
Female rugby sevens players
Rugby sevens players at the 2016 Summer Olympics
Olympic rugby sevens players of Kenya
Kenya international rugby sevens players
Kenya international women's rugby sevens players